Jeffrey Gluck is an American motorsports journalist for The Athletic. Gluck is best known for his coverage of NASCAR races, his "12 Questions" interviews, a column where he asks NASCAR drivers 12 random questions, and his "Quiet Track" photos, which are photos of a racetrack after a race is done. He has previously wrote for NASCAR Scene, USA Today, and his own reader-funded website.

Early life 
While in college at the University of Delaware, Gluck would be intrigued by a sports writing class offered by the university. As an avid sports fan, he would take the class and would begin to write for the school's newspaper. 

In his first newspaper job in Rocky Mount, North Carolina, he was asked to cover a race at the local Rockingham Speedway. This would spark Gluck's interest in NASCAR.

Career 
In 2007, Gluck was hired by the NASCAR Scene as an associate editor.

In 2009, he was laid off from NASCAR Scene due to economic issues caused by the Great Recession. At the same time, then-startup sports news blog SB Nation was looking for a NASCAR reporter to write for their website. CEO Jim Bankoff would proceed to hire Gluck, before leaving at the end of 2012 for USA Today.

In 2016, Gluck would come under fire from NASCAR after the league found an article from Gluck with the headline "“NASCAR Looks Beyond Declining Attendance, TV Ratings". NASCAR, which had been experiencing declining rating and attendance, was worried about their public appearance in the media, and during a midseason update meeting, a high-ranking official told Gluck and drivers that Gluck's coverage was "killing the sport". In a meeting without Gluck, someone held a copy of the article, and was spread as an example of negative coverage that "wasn't needed and couldn't afford" at the time. Some drivers were also angry at Gluck, including Carl Edwards. Another driver had said to Gluck "You fucked us!", although they had not read the article.

In 2017, Gluck would leave USA Today due to "family-related reasons" and would instead start up his own site that was funded by his own readers. According to Gluck, his wife, Sarah, was trying to become a Child Life Specialist, which would need the Gluck family to have flexibility on moving around the country.

In 2019, Gluck would get picked up and move his coverage to The Athletic, when the website wanted to start a new racing news section.

Personal life 
Gluck is currently married to Sarah Gluck. The two would welcome their second daughter in March 2021.

References 

American male journalists
American sports journalists
21st-century American writers
21st-century American journalists
University of Delaware alumni

Living people

Year of birth missing (living people)